Sikuru Hathe (  Translation: Venus at 7th place of the horoscope) is a 2007 Sri Lankan Sinhala comedy film directed by Giriraj Kaushalya and produced by Hans Anton Vanstarex for New Imperial Talkies. It stars Vijaya Nandasiri, Anarkali Akarsha and Suraj Mapa in lead roles along with Rodney Warnakula and Susila Kottage. Music composed by Tharupathi Munasinghe, and songs composed by Rohana Weerasinghe and Navaratne Gamage. It is the 1092nd Sri Lankan film in the Sinhala cinema. One of best comedy films ever produced in the country, Sikuru Hathe became the highest-grossing film in 2007 and won many awards at several local film award ceremonies.

The film earned a record collection of Rs. 26 million for 31 days with nearly 300,000 patrons in 25 cinema theaters across the country. It collected Rs. 50 million with 500,000 patrons on October 30 completes 75th day.

Plot
The story revolves around the match-maker Mangala Jaya (Vijaya), who is a poor, but kind hearted person with a single daughter. A series of hilarious incidents went through the plot, and though he is a match-maker, he fails to find a good boy to his young daughter. At last, his daughter was able to find the soul mate.

Cast
 Vijaya Nandasiri as Magala Jaya - the match-maker
 Anarkali Akarsha as OIC's daughter
 Suraj Mapa as Vidyartha
 Himali Sayurangi as Samanmali
 Rodney Warnakula as Sirimal
 Priyantha Seneviratne as Transgender 1
 Anton Jude as Transgender 2
 Susila Kottage as Mangala Jaya's wife
 Hemantha Iriyagama as Police Sergeant Ariyapala
 Tony Ranasinghe as OIC
 Iranganie Serasinghe as Vidyartha's granny
 Kumara Thirimadura as Carpenter 
 Mihira Sirithilaka as Necklace thief
 Sarath Kothalawala as Tortured husband
 Veena Jayakody as OIC's wife
 Vasantha Vittachchi as Police officer
 Lalith Janakantha as Three-wheel driver
 Jeevan Handunetti as Wedding photographer
 Bandula Wijeweera as Harmonium player
 Lal Kularatne as Veteran bachelor
 Sarath Chandrasiri as Police constable
 Ananda Atukorale as Polce constable
 Somasiri Alakolange as Vidyartha's grandfather
 Nilmini Kottegoda in uncredited role

Soundtrack

Awards
 2007 SIGNIS Award for Best Actor - Vijaya Nandasiri
 Most Popular Actor - Sarasaviya Awards
 2007 Sarasaviya Award for Best Up-coming actress - Himali Sayurangi
 2007 Sarasaviya Award for Best playback singer - Kasun Kalhara
 2007 Sarasaviya Merit Award - Hemantha Iriyagama

Re-release
After its huge popularity in 2007, the director Giriraj Kaushalya discussed about the re-release of the film. With that initiation, the film was re-released at the MPI, LFD and Tharu circuit cinemas on 4 February 2010.

References

2007 films
2000s Sinhala-language films